Fürstenberg-Meßkirch was a county of Fürstenberg centered on the town of Meßkirch. It was a partition of Fürstenberg-Blumberg, was raised to a principality in 1716, and was inherited by the counts of Fürstenberg-Fürstenberg in 1744.

Counts of Fürstenberg-Meßkirch (1614–1716)
Wratislaw II (1614–1642)
Francis Christopher (1642–1671)
Frederick Christopher (1671–1684)
Froben Ferdinand (1684–1716)

Princes of Fürstenberg-Meßkirch (1716–1744)
Froben Ferdinand (1716–1735)
Charles Frederick (1735–1744)

Fürstenberg (princely family)
Counties of the Holy Roman Empire
States and territories established in 1614
1614 establishments in the Holy Roman Empire